In the religious traditions of the Akan people and the Ashanti people of Ghana, Amokye is the woman who guards the entrance to the other world, which is called 'Asamando' (the Land of the Dead). She is the woman who welcome the souls of dead women to the otherworld. According to the beliefs, Ashanti women were dressed for bury in amoasie (loincloths) and jewelry, which they gave to Amokye as payment for allowing them to Asamando.

References 

African mythology
Ashanti people